Cheb Hasni, born Hasni Chakroun, (1 February 1968 – 29 September 1994), was an Algerian raï singer. He was popular across the Maghreb, having reached the height of his career in the late 1980s and early 1990s. He was the son of a welder and grew up in a working-class family where he was one of seven children. Hasni is most well known for his love songs, but he also dealt with taboo subjects such as divorce, romance and alcohol. He was murdered in 1994. Hasni's controversial lyrical content (particularly those on the 1987 hit song "El Baraka", which contained lyrics about drunken sexual intercourse) had drawn the ire of fanatic Islamist fundamentalists in Algeria and it is believed he was murdered as a result.

Early career

Born in Oran, Algeria, Cheb Hasni was interested in performing from an early age. In an interview published in the French newspaper Libération in 1992, Hasni recounted how "everyone knew me in our neighbourhood when I was a kid. I was always walking up the road with my school bag thrown off my shoulder, singing my head off".

Hasni's first significant performance as a singer occurred when he attended a local wedding party, where the group led by the famous Naoui brothers was playing. Impressed by his voice, they invited him to perform on stage at a well-known cabaret, La Guinguette. The second major launching point in Hasni's career came shortly afterwards when a producer asked him to record with Raï performer Chaba Zahouania.

During the summer of 1987 the pair recorded a provocative song by Algerian standards, "Beraka" ("The Shack"), gaining them much attention. The subjects of his songs were controversial and made the song popular with Algerian youth, who contributed to the song's estimated sales of one million copies. The success of "Beraka" made Hasni famous, and a controversial subject with both critics and fanatic fundamentalists already concerned over the popularity of the Raï genre. Another major hit was "El Visa" a song about migration, which sold approximately 250,000 cassettes.

Fame

Like many other Raï artists based in Algeria, Cheb Hasni spent more time performing abroad (giving concerts everywhere from Paris, Marseilles, and Boston to Washington DC, Tunis, Casablanca, and Tokyo, to name a few cities) than at home, due to curfews and musical restrictions in Algeria at the time. Hasni's last concert in his native country was on 5 July 1993, when he performed to an audience of over 150,000 fans in Algiers at an event organised to celebrate Algerian independence.

Hasni became one of the most prolific artists on the Raï scene, recording around 100 cassettes during his career. His distinctive "Raï love" style soon inspired imitators, notably Cheb Nasro, who launched his career in 1988 with the hit "Pour te faire plaisir".

Death
Hasni's fame and controversial songs led to his receiving death threats from Islamic fundamentalist extremists. His primary residence remained in Oran, even though his family lived in the safer environment of France. On 29 September 1994, he was the first raï musician to be murdered, outside his parents' home in the Gambetta district of Oran.

His death came amid other violent actions against notable Maghrebi performers. A few days before his death, the Kabyle Berber singer Lounès Matoub was abducted by the GIA. The following year, on 15 February 1995, Raï producer Rachid Baba-Ahmed was assassinated in Oran.

Legacy 

Despite the fact that Hasni died at an early age (26), he is considered as one of the best artists ever to have graced the Raï music. Almost three decades after his tragic death, his musical works are still widely listened to up this day, and a large number of the younger generation find inspiration in what he produced.

Discography (albums and singles) 
 1986 : Barraka (feat Zehwania)
 1987 : Ila Ajbek Ezzine 
 1987 : Issèlou aalik è oomri
 1987 : S'hab elbaroud 
 1987 : Hè bouya, llila mè tefrèchi
 1988 : Nbellaa bèbi 
 1988 : Ma dannitch netfèrkou
 1988 : Ssadda nass ellil
 1988 : Aadyèni bezzèf (Feat Noria) 
 1988 : C'est fini aalik yè mehhenti
 1988 : Moul el cabaret (Feat Abd Elhakk) 
 1988 : Netrajja f elhèbib 
 1989 : Sid elkadi 
 1989 : Bayda mon amour v1 
 1989 : Moulèt essag ddrif
 1989 : Enroh maak laaziza
 1989 : Chchira lli nebriha dima ybènli khyèl'ha
 1990 : Adieu l'amour 
 1990 : "Tèlbouni hetta f echchira"
 1990 : Saadek tzouwwejti 
 1990 : Aalèch rani maadeb
 1990 : Chkoune irabbili weldi 
 1990 : Èna barkèni, ènas kilouni 
 1990 :Love me say 
 1990 : Rah Ben Bella l essaddam (Single) 
 1991 : J'ai mal au cœur
 1991 : Lmossiba kharja m e lycée
 1991 : Chlèrmek deggouni (Feat Zohra)
 1991 : Elli zahreh mè yendamchi (Single) 
 1991 : Tout l' monde est là 
 1991 : Wellah mè kount dèyrek passager 
 1991 : Mon Premier Amour 
 1991 : Dis moi ha zzarga 
 1991 : Ssaraha raha 
 1991 : Hdartou fiya ou goultou mèt (3 titres de hasni et 3 titres de nasro)
 1991 : Elli dlamni wellah mani msèmheh
 1991 : Charaatni 
 1991 : Nediha meryoula 
 1991 : C'est pas la peine 
 1991 : Rabta lhenna
 1992 : Ghir dommage 
 1992 : Tlabti lfrèk 
 1992 : Oran la france 
 1992 : Ghir mè tebkich 
 1992 : Aakkar
 1992 : C'est fini
 1992 : Tal ryèbek yè rzèli 
 1992 : Choufi oomri cha sra 
 1993 : Rani khellithè lek èmèna 
 1993 : Mè nnejemch eniich d eliicha 
 1993 : C est la logique yè bent ennès
 1993 : Hebbitek mè s'elt ennès 
 1993 : Dèymen enwassik
 1993 : Ki nchouf'ha yerkebni lhbèl 
 1993 : Guaa ennsa 
 1993 : Hekmet aalia rrab elaali (feat Zèhia) 
 1993 : Mani mani
 1993 : Tebki wella mè tebkich  
 1993 : Enfin lkit elli tefhemni 
 1993 : Brit èna nchoufek 
 1993 : Rani Mourak 
 1993 : Nti sbèb rbinti 
 1994 : Guaa errjèl elli kèyen 
 1994 : Aeadouya megh'yar 
 1994 :  Ddèteh emmigré 
 1994 : Khawwefni rjouaak 
 1994 : Meddit aahdi, ça y'est c'est fini
 1994 : Saàdini (Feat Sorya Kinane, & Bouzid Abdelghani) 
 1994 : Ma bkatch elhedda 
 1994 : Aalèch yè aayniyya 
 1994 : Rabbi ltof biya   
 1994 : Iridoni bnèt ennès (Single)
 1994 : Aaayit ensaleh, aayit neddareb 
 1994 : Srat biyya kassa
 1994 : Rani nèdem aalè liyyèm (december'''94)
 1994 : Rani marra hna ou marra lhih (december'''94)

Gallery

References

External links
  "Hasni une légende a l image de l Algerie"
  « Cheb Hasni, une legende a l'image de l'Algerie »
  "Cheb Hasni, histoire d'une tragédie" 
  "biographie de Cheb Hasni"

1968 births
1994 deaths
Assassinated Algerian people
People murdered in Algeria
Raï musicians
20th-century Algerian  male  singers